WMIL-FM (106.1 MHz) is a commercial radio station licensed to Waukesha, Wisconsin, and serving the Greater Milwaukee/Southeast Wisconsin radio market.  It carries a country music radio format and is owned by iHeartMedia. The studios and offices are located in the Milwaukee suburb of Greenfield.

WMIL-FM has an effective radiated power (ERP) of 12,000 watts.  The transmitter site is in Milwaukee's North Side off Humboldt Boulevard near Estabrook Park and the Milwaukee River.  WMIL-FM broadcasts in the HD Radio hybrid format.  The HD2 digital subchannel formerly aired alternative rock from the 1990s and 2000s as "Alt 2K."

History

WAUX-FM, WAUK-FM
On January 1, 1962, the station signed on as WAUX-FM, sister station to WAUX 1510 AM.  The stations were owned by the Waukesha Broadcasting Company.  At the time, WAUX-FM’s effective radiated power was 3,800 watts, a fraction of its current output.

Because WAUX was a daytimer, the two stations simulcast during the day and programming continued on WAUX-FM at night.  A few years later in 1965, they became WAUK and WAUK-FM respectively.  During the 1970s, WAUK-FM aired a beautiful music format.

WMIL-FM
In December 1975, the station adopted the WMIL-FM call sign (originally used by 95.7 FM). Stebbins Communications acquired the two stations in 1975.  For a time, WMIL-FM was dark when Stebbins went bankrupt. The AM station had already been sold to another company in 1977.

Charter Broadcasting, which already owned WOKY 920 AM, purchased WMIL-FM in 1979. The company sold WOKY and WMIL-FM to Sundance Broadcasting in June 1983.  The easy listening format was starting to age in the 1980s and the new owners had a different plan for WMIL-FM.

Country music
The present country format was launched on WMIL-FM, competing against 102.9 WBCS (now active rock station WHQG). As a country station, WMIL-FM has long been successful in the local ratings. Clear Channel Communications, a forerunner to today's iHeartMedia, bought WMIL-FM and WOKY for $40 million in 1997.  In 2007, WMIL-FM was voted "Top Country Station in a Large Market". The station competes with country stations in surrounding suburbs (WMBZ in West Bend and WVTY in Racine), but generally has outdone any competitors in Milwaukee proper since the mid-80s.

Current programming
The station's local morning show is co-hosted by Shaun Ridder, Scott Dolphin, and Shannen Oestereich, with afternoons hosted by assistant program director/music director Shanna "Quinn" Hoy. Other shifts are voicetracked by iHeart country hosts such as Billy Greenwood (late mornings/noontime) and Ric Rush (evenings). Syndicated programming includes CMT After Midnite With Granger Smith in overnights, with Bob Kingsley's Country Top 40 and a weekly best-of edition The Bobby Bones Show on weekends to keep local exclusivity of that show with iHeartMedia.

References

External links
FM 106.1
Milwaukee radio: a retrospective

MIL-FM
Radio stations established in 1962
IHeartMedia radio stations